Bahawalani is a sub-division of the Abro tribe. Bahawalani are descendants of Bahawaldin Abro I, and are natives of Larkana city of the Sindh province, Pakistan.

History 
Bahawalani are Abro descendants of Jams of Samma Dynasty migrated from southern Sindh to the northern Sindh and are settled in Larkana city now.

See also 
 Samma Dynasty
 Jam Tamachi
 Abro

Samma tribes
Sindhi tribes